The following is a list of players and who appeared in at least one game for the Cincinnati Reds franchise, which played in the National League from 1876–1879. For players from the current Cincinnati Reds, see Cincinnati Reds all-time roster.

References

External links
Baseball Reference

Major League Baseball all-time rosters
Reds roster (1)
Roster